We Are One is a 2020 documentary film directed by Stéphane de Freitas and starring Afaq, Panmela Castro and Stéphane de Freitas. It is about how French musician Matthieu Chedid brings together activists from around the world to be part of a video of the song Solidarité (Solidarity) that he wrote.
The film was released on July 14, 2020, on Netflix.

References

External links
 
 

2020 films
2020 documentary films
Netflix original documentary films
2020s French-language films
French-language Netflix original films
French documentary films
2020s French films